The Kabika River is a tributary of the Burntbush River, flowing in the Cochrane District, in Northeastern Ontario, in Canada.

Forestry is the main economic activity of the sector; recreational tourism activities, second. The west side of this slope is served by the Ontario road 652.

The surface of the river is usually frozen from early November to mid-May, but safe circulation on the ice generally occurs from mid-November to the end of April.

Geography 
The hydrographic slopes adjacent to the Kabika River are:
 North side: Mikwam River, Burntbush River;
 East side: East Kabika River, Patten River, Turgeon River;
 South side: Lake Abitibi, La Reine River (Lake Abitibi);
 west side: Case River, Kenning River, Seguin River, Payntouk Creek.

The Kabika River originates at the mouth of a small forest lake in the north of the township of Scapa. This lake is situated to the northeast of a mountain whose summit reaches . Its mouth is located in the north of the North-East Bay of Lake Abitibi.

From the mouth of the small head lake, the Kabika River flows on  according to the following segments:
 to the mouth of Lake Kabika (length: , altitude:  to the north in the township of Scapa) which overlaps the townships of Scapa and Abbotsford;
 to the north winding through the township of Abbotsford and Case, to the limit of the township of Singer;
 to the north by winding in Singer Township, then Kenning Township to the confluence of the Case River (coming from the West);
 to the north winding through Kenning Township, then Singer, to the boundary of the Tomlinson Township;
 to the north, then northeast, winding through Tomlinson Township, then Hurtubise, to the confluence of the East Kabika River (coming from the south);
 to the north-west by forming a hook to the north-west and another to the south-east, to its mouth.

Toponymy 
The following toponyms are of the same origin and are in the same area of the Cochrane District: Kabika River, East Kakiba River.

See also 
Burntbush River, a watercourse
Turgeon River, a stream
Harricana River, a watercourse
James Bay
Cochrane District (Ontario)
Northeastern Ontario
List of rivers of Ontario

References

External links 

Rivers of Cochrane District